Cosmas III may refer to:

 Pope Cosmas III of Alexandria, ruled in 920–932
 Cosmas III of Constantinople, Ecumenical Patriarch in 1714–1716
 Cosmas III of Alexandria, Greek Patriarch of Alexandria in 1737–1746